Popcorn, Indiana is an American brand of popcorn that was introduced in 2002. The brand is headquartered in Westport, Connecticut and Indianapolis, Indiana - 72 miles north of the community that gave it its name: Popcorn, Indiana.

Products

Popcorn, Indiana's ready-to-eat popcorns are free from trans fats, gluten, preservatives, and genetically modified foods (GMOS). Most products are cholesterol-free, and some flavors are available in an organic variety. The products are also produced without artificial colors. There are two main types of products from Popcorn, Indiana: Classic Popcorn and Drizzlecorn. Its products are also certified by the Whole Grains Council.

History
The brand was founded by Warren Struhl and Richard Demb in 2002. The investors also included Isiah Thomas of the New York Knicks and Goldman, Sachs & Co. The company also at one point included the Dale and Thomas Popcorn brand.

In August 2017, Eagle Foods, a manufacturer of condensed milks and snacks, acquired the brand.

See also

 List of popcorn brands

References

External links
 Official website

Popcorn brands
Products introduced in 2002
American brands